Zheng Kelu (August 1, 1939 – September 20, 2020) was a Chinese translator best known for translating French literature. For his contributions to the introduction of French literature to foreign readers, he was honored with the French National Medal in Education (First Class) in 1987 by René Monory.

Biography
Zheng was born in Portuguese Macau on August 1, 1939. His grandfather Zheng Guanying was a reformist active in the late Qing dynasty. In the third grade of primary school, Zheng went to study at Nanyang Model Primary School after his father's job transferred to Shanghai. After graduating from No.1 High School Affiliated to East China Normal University in 1957, he was admitted by Peking University. He liked Russian literature and planned to apply for the Russian Department, but the Sino-Soviet relationship was so tense that the Russian Department did not recruit new students, so he entered the French department.

After university in 1962, he did his postgraduate work at the Institute of Foreign Literature, Chinese Academy of Social Sciences under Li Jianwu. In 1969, he was sent to the May Seventh Cadre Schools to do farm works in Xi County, Henan. At the end of the Cultural Revolution, he reviewed French and recited French dictionaries in his spare time.

In 1979, he completed and published his first literary translation Longevity Potion (written by Honoré de Balzac) in World Literature magazine. Then he translated several pieces of Honoré de Balzac's works successively. From 1981 to 1983, he was a visiting scholar at the University of Sorbonne Nouvelle Paris 3. In 1984, he joined the faculty of Wuhan University and became director of its French Department and director of the Institute of French Studies. He joined the China Writers Association in 1984 and joined the Communist Party of China in 1985. On March 13, 1987, the French government bestowed its National Medal in Education (First Class) on him for his contributions to the introduction of French literature to foreign readers. He was transferred to Shanghai in 1987 and that same year became a professor at Shanghai Normal University, where he worked until his retirement in 2009. He died at Shanghai Sixth People's Hospital on September 20, 2020.

Personal life
Zheng married Zhu Biheng, an English literature translator.

Works

Translations

Awards
 1987 French National Medal in Education (First Class) for his contributions to the introduction of French literature to foreign readers
 2010 Title of "Senior Translator" by the Chinese Translation Association
 2012 Fu Lei Translation and Publishing Award for translating The Second Sex

References

1939 births
2020 deaths
People from Zhongshan
Peking University alumni
Academic staff of Wuhan University
Shanghai Normal University alumni
French–Chinese translators